Paper yarn is the yarn made from paper strips chiefly with wood pulp cut into strips and then twisted to form a yarn. Germany invented Paper yarn in the late 19th century, although paper has been used in textiles in Japan for centuries. They used various products made of paper yarn during and after wartime.

Method 
The process was simple by cutting moist wood pulp into fine strips and then spinning into yarn. The thickness of the yarn depends upon the used strips or fiber.

Trade marks 

Licella is a paper yarn made of wood pulp. Silvalin is similar paper yarn to Licella. Xylolin was a variety of Paper yarn made in Saxony. Developed by Emil Claviej in 1903, it was less prone to shrinkage and had better water stability. It was also used in manufacturing carpet backing.

Use 

 Cheap clothing material.
 Cordage
 Shoelaces
 Braids
 Webbing
 Sand bags for army

See also 

 Papyrus
Washi
 Twine
 Wood pulp

References 

Paper
Textiles
Yarn